Nabil Alioui (born 18 February 1999) is a French footballer who plays as a forward for Le Havre.

Club career
On 12 August 2020, he signed a four-year contract with Le Havre.

International career
Born in France, Alioui is of Moroccan and Malagasy descent. Alioui is a youth international for France, and represented the France U19s at the 2018 UEFA European Under-19 Championship.

References

External links

 
 
 

1999 births
French sportspeople of Moroccan descent
Living people
Sportspeople from Toulon
French footballers
France youth international footballers
Association football forwards
AS Monaco FC players
Cercle Brugge K.S.V. players
Le Havre AC players
Championnat National 2 players
Belgian Pro League players
Ligue 2 players
French expatriate footballers
Expatriate footballers in Belgium
French expatriate sportspeople in Belgium
Footballers from Provence-Alpes-Côte d'Azur